The 2018 Rochdale Borough Council election took place on 3 May 2018 to elect members of Rochdale Borough Council in England. This was on the same day as other local elections.

Overall result
Vote share changes compared to 2016.

Ward results

Balderstone & Kirkholt

Bamford

Castleton

Central Rochdale

East Middleton

Healey

Hopwood Hall

Kingsway

Littleborough Lakeside

Mikstone & Deeplish

Milnrow & Newhey

Norden

North Heywood

North Middleton

Smallbridge & Firgrove

South Middleton

Spotland & Falinge

Wardle & West Littleborough

West Heywood

West Middleton

By-elections and other changes
Kathleen Nickson of Balderstone and Kirkholt ward defected from Labour to the Liberal Democrats in January 2019, saying that the Labour leadership "told [me] what to do, what to say and how to vote."

References

2018 English local elections
2018
2010s in Greater Manchester